The Hixson–Mixsell House, also known as the Springtown Stagecoach Inn, is a historic building at 157 County Route 519 in the village of Springtown, in Pohatcong Township, Warren County, New Jersey. It was added to the National Register of Historic Places on May 12, 2014 for its significance in architecture.

History
In the 1760s, a land tract along the Pohatcong Creek, including the site of this house and the future village of Springtown, was purchased by Joseph Hixson. By 1801, Hixson had built a residence, sawmill, and gristmill here. After his death, the property was sold in 1814 to Jacob Mixsell and his son John. They built a distillery here. In 1836, Jacob sold the property to his son, David Mixsell, who later built the brick portion of this house.

Description
The main block is a two and one-half story brick building with Federal and Greek Revival styles and featuring Flemish bond on the east and south walls. The western half of the rear wing uses plank frame construction.

Gallery

See also
 Hixson–Skinner Mill Complex

References

External links

 

		

Pohatcong Township, New Jersey
Buildings and structures in Warren County, New Jersey
Taverns in New Jersey
National Register of Historic Places in Warren County, New Jersey
Drinking establishments on the National Register of Historic Places in New Jersey
New Jersey Register of Historic Places
Federal architecture in New Jersey
Greek Revival houses in New Jersey
Brick buildings and structures